Lipna is a rural locality (a village) in Pekshinskoye Rural Settlement, Petushinsky District, Vladimir Oblast, Russia. The population was 704 as of 2010. There are 4 streets.

Geography 
Lipna is located on the Bolshaya Lipnya River, 15 km east of Petushki (the district's administrative centre) by road. Trud is the nearest rural locality.

References 

Rural localities in Petushinsky District